is a Japanese voice actor from Okayama Prefecture, Japan.

Biography

Filmography

Anime
2001
A Little Snow Fairy Sugar as Salt
2011
One Piece Marine, Caribou's child, pirate, fishman
2012
One Piece as Marine (ep 576)
Code:Breaker as Club Member (ep 1)
The Pet Girl of Sakurasou as Boy A (ep 2)
2013
A Lull in the Sea as Youth Group B
Futari wa Milky Holmes 
Kill la Kill as Student D (ep 1)
Little Busters! as Disciplinary committee member D (ep 16); Male relative A (ep 17)
Little Busters! as Student E (ep 8)
Toriko as Tsukimaru
White Album 2 as Male teacher
Yozakura Quartet ~Hana no Uta~
2014
A Lull in the Sea as Youth Group
Ace of Diamond as Kazuma Akiba
Aldnoah Zero as Platoon leader (eps 1-2)
Barakamon as man (ep 1); Hiroshi's friend (ep 2)
Captain Earth as Trias; Bus driver (ep 23)
Celestial Method as Kakariin (ep 6)
Dragon Ball Super as Monk, Crowd, Citizen, Displaced people
Happiness Charge Precure! as Seiji Sagara
La Corda d'Oro Blue Sky as Critic (ep 1)
Lord Marksman and Vanadis as Follower (ep 1); Soldier (eps 2, 12-13); Commanding Officer (ep 3); Farmer (ep 4); Knight Commander (ep 5); Officer (ep 8); Ambassador (ep 9); Man (ep 10)
Kill la Kill as Public Morals Committee Member C (ep 13)
M3 the dark metal as Male Student A (ep 1)
No Game No Life as Robber (ep 1)
Nobunaga the Fool as Oda's Vassal B; Village Adult (ep 15); Soldiers (ep 17); Samurai-General (ep 20)
Nobunagun as News Commentator (ep 2)
One Piece as Sea Lapahn (eps 626-628)
Oreca Battle as Kokko
Selector Infected Wixoss as Editor (eps 6-7)
Selector Spread Wixoss as Editor (eps 10)
The File of Young Kindaichi Returns as Kōjirō Okazaki
Witch Craft Works as Prison guard 2 (ep 4)
World Trigger as Takaaki Katagiri (ep 5)
Yuki Yuna is a Hero as Newscaster (ep 12)
2015
Ace of Diamond as Kazuma Akiba
Aldnoah Zero as Martian soldier (eps 23-24)
Doraemon as Male A
Dragon Ball Super as Earthling
Food Wars!: Shokugeki no Soma as Subordinate A (ep 1); Male student B (ep 7)
Golden Time as Kōichirō; Police Officer 2 (ep 16)
Is It Wrong to Try to Pick Up Girls in a Dungeon? as Customer (ep 1); God B (ep 2); Adventurer (eps 8, 13); Adventurer A (eps 9, 12); Minotaur (ep 10)
Maria the Virgin Witch as England Army Captain (ep 3); Male Citizen A (ep 10)
Shimoneta: A Boring World Where the Concept of Dirty Jokes Doesn't Exist as Salaryman
The Seven Deadly Sins as Simon
Ultimate Otaku Teacher as Muscle Expedition Club President (ep 14)
World Trigger as Teruteru Kōda
2016
Alderamin on the Sky as Torway Remeon
The Seven Deadly Sins: Signs of Holy War as Simon
2017
Little Witch Academia as Andrew Hanbridge
2018
GeGeGe no Kitarō 6 as Shō (ep 6)
2019
A Certain Magical Index III as Shiokishi (eps 15-17)
2021
D Cide Traumerei as Man (ep 4)

OVA
2012
Lupin III Master File as Police C
2013
Kagaku Na Yatsura as Creature C

Web anime
2016
Whistle! (Voice Remake Version) as Shigeki Satō

Video games
2011
Kamen Rider: Climax Heroes Fourze as Kamen Rider Ibuki
Sto☆Mani ~Strobe☆Mania~
2012
Atelier Ayesha: The Alchemist of Dusk
The Legend of Heroes: Trails to Azure Evolution as Transportation staff
Angelic Crest as Fairdy
All Kamen Rider: Rider Generation as Kamen Rider Gills, Kamen Rider Ibuki
Kamen Rider Max Heroes as Kamen Rider Ibuki, Kamen Rider Gills
Kuroko's Basketball: Kiseki no Game
Kurohyō 2: Ryū ga Gotoku Ashura Hen
Shin Ken to Mahōto Gakuenmono. Koku no Gakuen
Fist of the North Star: Ken's Rage 2 as Huey
Storm Lover Kai!!
Persona 4: The Golden
Yakuza 5
2013
Kamen Rider Battride War
God Eater 2 as Player's voice (Male 02 & Male 05)
2014
Vinculum Hearts ~Iris Mahō Gakuen~ as A-Jay Blackford
Kamen Rider Summon Ride!
Kamen Rider Battride War II as Kamen Rider Ibuki
Majin Bone: Jikan to Kūkan no Majin as My Fighter
2015
Arcadia no Aoki Miko
Super Robot Wars BX
Super Robot Wars ZIII
God Eater 2 Rage Burst as Player's voice
God Eater Resurrection as Player's voice
2016
Nejimaki Seirei Senki: Tenkyō no Alderamin: Road of Royal Knights as Torway Remeon
2017
Akane Sasu Sekai de Kimi to Utau as Masayuki Yui
Super Robot Wars V as Wieltab Text
2018
Gunka wo Haita Neko as Yuzu
Super Robot Wars V
MapleStory as Will
Valkyria Chronicles 4 as Claude Wallace
2021
 Tsukihime: A Piece of Blue Glass Moon as Shiki Tohno

Drama CD
2016 
Alderamin on the Sky Drama CD as Torway Remeon

Reading CD
Unknown Date
Spooky Stories Oumagadoki 7 as president, man, moth

Radio Drama
2012
Aoyama Nichōme Gekijō
Jugemu as Moderator
Shibahama as Doctor
Kasa to Niji to Jinx to as Atsuya Soejima
2013
Aoyama Nichōme Gekijō
Yokkun Part 1 as Yoshinobu Nakamura
Yokkun Part 2 as Yoshinobu Nakamura
2014
Aoyama Nichōme Gekijō
Watashi no Dokuritsukinenbi as Takuya
Natsu Soldout ~2-bu 42-byō no Densetsu~ Part 1 as Yasushi
Natsu Soldout ~2-bu 42-byō no Densetsu~ Part 2 as Yasushi
2015
Aoyama Nichōme Gekijō
Bijin OL no Tsūshinbo as Shunsuke Hayami
Hōmonsha as Man
Watashi no Haha wa as Sūmei
70-Nen-me no Shokutaku as Isamu
Kōya no Blues Redfield as Bat
Koko ni Irukoto as Tsuyoshi
Heya ga Yondeiru as Yasuyuki
Christmas no nai Hoshi kara Kita Otoko as Saitō
2016
Aoyama Nichōme Gekijō
Seigi no Mikata as Shingo
Café Liberty no Yangotonaki Okata as Kusano

Overseas Dubbing
2013
Collision Course as Kabir Ali
2014
Mystic Eyes as Gary
The Strain
2016
The Strain Second Season
2020
Anne with an E as Gilbert Blythe

Radio
2014
Hitomi Yoshida's Precure Radio Cure Cure♡Prety (ABC Radio)

References

External links
Official agency profile 

Living people
Aoni Production voice actors
Japanese male video game actors
Japanese male voice actors
Male voice actors from Okayama Prefecture
21st-century Japanese male actors
1988 births